Tawny Taylor is an American author who writes paranormal and contemporary romance. Taylor currently resides in Detroit with her husband and children.

Bibliography
 Private Games (2005)
 Body and Soul (2006)
 Sex and the Single Ghost (2006)
 Animal Urges (2007)
 Dirty Little Lies (2007)
 Master of Secret Desires (June, 2007)
 Immortal Secrets (October, 2007)
 Real Vamps Don't Drink O-Neg (September, 2007)
 Dark Master (2008)
 Tempting Fate (2008)
 Behind the Mask (2008)
 Wet & Wilde (2008)
 Prisoner of Love (2009)
 Wicked Beast (2009)
 Trick or Treat (2009)
 Captured by Twilight (2009)
 Burning Hunger (2009)
 Carnal Hunger (2009)
 Double Take (2009)
 Everlasting Hunger (2009)
 Torrid Hunger (2009)
 Prince of Fire (2009)
 Decadent Master (2010)
 Everlasting Twilight (2010)
 Wrath's Embrace (2010)
 Claim Me (2010)
 Girl Enslaved (2011)
 Wild Knights (2011)
 Wicked Knights (2011)
 Darkest Fire (2011)
 Wanton Knights (2011)
 Enslaved by Sin (2011)
 Slave of Duty (2011)
 Lust's Temptation (2011)
 Triple Stud (2011)
 Threesome (2011)
 Dangerous Master (2011)
 Her Devilish Dom (2011)
 Wild, Wicked & Wanton (2012)
 Claim Me (2012)
 Shades of Pleasure (2012)
 Compromising Positions (2012)
 What He Demands (2012)
 What He Wants (2012)
 At His Mercy (2012)
 Darkest Desire (2012)
 What He Craves (2012)

References

External links
Tawny Taylor's Official Website
Tawny Taylor's Official Blog
Tawny Taylor's E-Book listing

21st-century American novelists
American fantasy writers
American women novelists
Living people
Year of birth missing (living people)
Women science fiction and fantasy writers
21st-century American women writers